John Gell may refer to:
Sir John Gell, 1st Baronet (1592–1671), Parliamentarian in the English Civil War
Sir John Gell, 2nd Baronet (1612–1689), lead mining magnate and MP for Derbyshire
John Eyre Gell (died 1739), known as John Eyre before inheriting the Gell estate and mines, see Gell baronets
John Gell (admiral) (1740–1806), British admiral
John Gell (Manx language activist) (1899–1983)

See also
Gell baronets
Gell (surname)